Saoba Stone Pillars, as known as Wuhe Stone Pillars, is an archaeological site at Wuhe Village, Ruisui Township, Hualien County, Taiwan.

History
The stone pillar are artifacts from Beinan culture since Stone Age era around 2,000-3,000 years ago. The site was then classified as 3rd grade national historic monument by the Ministry of the Interior.

Geology
The stones stand along the Wuhe Terrace. The site consists of two adjacent stone pillars standing with 5.75 meters and 3.99 meters of height. It is located in an oval area with 600 meters in length and 400 meters in width.

Transportation
The site is accessible south of Ruisui Station of Taiwan Railways.

See also
 List of parks in Taiwan
 Prehistory of Taiwan

References

Archaeological sites in Taiwan
Buildings and structures in Hualien County